Grand Valley Dani, or simply Dani, is one of the most populous Papuan languages in Indonesian New Guinea (also known as Papua). The Dani people live in the Baliem Valley of the Western Highlands.

Dialects
Dialectical differentiation is great enough that Ethnologue assigns separate codes to three varieties:
Lower
Mid or Central, also known as Tulem
Upper

Lower Grand Valley Dani contains subdialects Lower Grand Valley Hitigima (Dani-Kurima, Kurima), Upper Bele, Lower Bele, Lower Kimbin (Kibin), and Upper Pyramid. Hupla, traditionally considered a separate language, is closer to Lower Grand Valley than the varieties of Grand Valley Dani are to each other.

Phonology
Grand Valley Dani has established its own orthography during a conference between linguists of the Dutch New Guinea government and different missionary bodies on February 1961. This is the phonology of the Central Grand Valley Dani language:

Consonants 

Unlike other orthographies of local languages in Indonesia (largely based on the standard orthography), the original Grand Valley Dani orthography (the current one might be not known) has j instead of y, in common with the Indonesian old spelling.

 The letters ⟨p, t, k⟩ are pronounced as aspirated /, / in word-initial position and as [, ] in intervocalic positions, respectively. They merge with voiceless /, / syllable-finally, which is also represented by graphic voiced consonants ⟨b, d, g⟩. However, aspirated consonants still occur intervocalically, see below.
 The phoneme  merges with preceding or following phonemes:
 It aspirates preceding ⟨p, t, k⟩, creating effectively phonemic aspirated consonants in intervocalic positions (japha  "they fought").

Vowels

Grammar

Verbs 
Verbs in Grand Valley Dani are highly inflected for many tenses. Infinitive is marked by the suffix -in, although verb stems in -s- change to -t- before consonants: wetasin "to roast", but wetathy "I roasted".

Finite tenses 

Although there are claimed "default" personal markers, the correspondences between tense suffixes and personal markers are often highly irregular. Nevertheless, inflections of verbs are still highly regular. Unless denoted in the table, verb forms are marked by personal markers.

Semantics 
The Dani language differentiates only two basic colours, mili for cool/dark shades such as blue, green, and black, and mola for warm/light colours such as red, yellow, and white. This trait makes it an interesting field of research for language psychologists, such as Eleanor Rosch, investigating the Whorf hypothesis.

References

Further reading
 
 

Dani languages
Languages of western New Guinea